Cooloola Cove is a coastal locality in the Gympie Region, Queensland, Australia.

Geography
Cooloola Cove is in the Wide Bay-Burnett region, 219 kilometers or a two-and-a-half-hour drive north of the state capital Brisbane and a 52-kilometre or half-hour drive from the Council Seat and city, Gympie.

History

Amenities 
Cooloola Wesleyan Methodist Church meets at the Veterans & Community Hall on the corner of Nautilus Drive and Santa Maria Court. It is part of the Wesleyan Methodist Church of Australia.

References

Gympie Region
Localities in Queensland